Flowers in a Vase is a 17th-century painting, usually attributed to Jan Brueghel the Elder but sometimes argued to be a collaboration between him and his son Jan Brueghel the Younger. It was probably painted around 1620, before the son's trip to Italy. It is now in the Royal Museum of Fine Arts, Antwerp as catalogue number 643.

References

1620 paintings
Paintings in the collection of the Royal Museum of Fine Arts Antwerp
Paintings by Jan Brueghel the Elder
Still life paintings